Tuariki John Edward Delamere (born 9 December 1951) is a former New Zealand politician. He served as a member of the New Zealand Parliament from 1996 to 1999, and was a member of Cabinet for the duration of his term.

Early life
Delamere was born in 1951 at a military hospital in Papakura, and was educated in Tauranga, attending Tauranga Boys' College. In 1967 and 1969, he was recognised as the top Māori student in New Zealand. He then attended Washington State University on an athletic scholarship. Delamere obtained a Bachelor of Arts in 1974. He later obtained a Master of Business Administration from Long Island University.

Delamere served in the United States Army from 1974 to 1978. He was accountant stationed at Fort Leonard Wood, Missouri and later joined the staff at the United States Military Academy at West Point, New York. After leaving the United States, Delamere worked as chief financial officer for Polynesian Airlines. He also held a number of bureaucratic roles.

Delamere has also been successful in sporting events; setting records in long jump and triple jump, and representing New Zealand in those events in the 1974 Commonwealth Games at Christchurch. At Washington State,  he pioneered the technique of a full somersault in long jump competitions.

Political career

New Zealand First

Delamere entered politics in the 1996 elections, when he successfully stood as a candidate for the New Zealand First party in the Te Tai Rawhiti electorate, defeating Sir Peter Tapsell and becoming one of the group known as the Tight Five. Immediately after being elected, he was appointed to Cabinet as part of New Zealand First's coalition deal with the National Party. Among the roles he held during his ministerial career were those of Minister of Immigration, Minister of Pacific Island Affairs, Associate Minister of Finance, and Associate Minister of Health.

In 1998, the coalition between New Zealand First and the National Party began to break apart, and significant tensions emerged in New Zealand First itself. On 11 August, it was claimed by ACT MP Rodney Hide that Delamere was planning a coup against New Zealand First leader Winston Peters, an allegation which Delamere denied. Two days later, Delamere acknowledged that he had been exploring the possibility of a new political party based around the so-called "tight five", New Zealand First's group of Māori MPs (not counting Peters himself). When Peters was sacked from Cabinet, Delamere openly supported the move, and pledged his support to the National Party government regardless of his party's stance. Delamere formally resigned from New Zealand First on 18 August 1998, saying that the party would be better known as "Winston First".

Independent and Te Tawharau
As an independent, Delamere continued to support the National government, and retained his ministerial portfolios.

On 22 December 1998, Delamere announced gay and lesbian couples applying for permanent residency would have the same rights as straight de facto couples: a change Max Bradford, when Minister of Immigration, stated was too difficult.

In late 1999, however, he lost his role as Minister of Immigration after a scandal regarding the application of immigration rules. Specifically, it emerged that Delamere had approved permanent residency for a group of Chinese businessmen provided they invested generously in various Māori development schemes. Delamere was widely criticised for using his authority to ensure that money was given to certain groups. Delamere himself claimed that his actions were a perfectly reasonable method of addressing Māori development needs. Although he lost the immigration portfolio, he retained his other roles.

Shortly before the 1999 elections, Delamere joined the small Māori Te Tawharau party, giving it its first representation in Parliament. He had previously declined to join the Mauri Pacific party, established by five other former New Zealand First MPs (including three of his "tight five" colleagues). Shortly prior to the election, Delamere announced that his party would support only a Labour Party government on confidence and supply if it won seats in the new Parliament. This was at odds with Delamere's unwavering support of the legislative programme of the Shipley Administration. In the elections, Delamere contested the new Waiariki electorate — he placed second, with 20.01% of the vote. The winner was Mita Ririnui of the Labour Party. He was also placed second on the party list of the Mana Māori Movement, which Te Tawharau was affiliated with, but the party did not win any seats.

The Opportunities Party
In July 2020, more than twenty years after Delamere last stood for office, he joined The Opportunities Party (TOP) and served as its immigration spokesperson and candidate for Auckland Central in the 2020 election. During the 2020 election held on 17 October, Delamere only obtained 320 votes while the TOP party obtained 776 party votes in Auckland Central based on preliminary results.

Private sector
Since leaving Parliament, Delamere has established himself as an immigration consultant, founding the company of Tuariki Delamere & Associates. He also owns a successful cabaret restaurant in Auckland, Finale Restaurant and Cabaret.

In 2000 Delamere rejoined the New Zealand National Party, the party he had started his political career with. However he ruled out a return to Parliament to concentrate on his business concerns.

In March and November 2005, Delamere appeared in court on charges of fraud. The trial began in the High Court in Auckland on 7 February 2007. After a 4-week trial, the jury found him not guilty of all charges after less than 2 hours of deliberation on 2 March 2007.

References

1951 births
Living people
New Zealand First MPs
The Opportunities Party politicians
Long Island University alumni
Washington State University alumni
Members of the Cabinet of New Zealand
United States Army officers
New Zealand businesspeople
New Zealand male long jumpers
New Zealand male triple jumpers
Commonwealth Games competitors for New Zealand
Athletes (track and field) at the 1974 British Commonwealth Games
New Zealand MPs for Māori electorates
Te Tawharau MPs
New Zealand sportsperson-politicians
New Zealand National Party politicians
Mana Māori Movement politicians
Members of the New Zealand House of Representatives
Unsuccessful candidates in the 1999 New Zealand general election
People from Papakura
21st-century New Zealand politicians
Unsuccessful candidates in the 2020 New Zealand general election